The Rt. Rev. Dr. Chauncey Bunce Brewster (September 5, 1848 – April 9, 1941) was the fifth Bishop of the Episcopal Diocese of Connecticut.

Early life and education
Brewster was born in Windham, Connecticut, to the Rev. Joseph Brewster and Sarah Jane Bunce. His father was rector of St Paul's Church in Windham, New York, and later became rector of Christ Church in New Haven, Connecticut. His younger brother was Benjamin Brewster, later Bishop of Western Colorado. The family were descendants of the Mayflower passenger William Brewster.

Brewster attended Hopkins Grammar School before studying at Yale College, where he was elected Phi Beta Kappa and was a member of the Skull and Bones society. He graduated from Yale in 1868 and attended Berkeley Divinity School the following year, graduating from there in 1872. 

He was later awarded a Doctor of Divinity (DD) degree by Trinity College (1897), Yale (1898) and Wesleyan University (1903).

Career
Brewster was a tutor in Latin and Greek at Yale from 1870 to 1871 before being ordained deacon in 1872 and priest in 1873.

He then served as curate of St Andrew's Church in Meriden, Connecticut (1872−1873), rector of Christ's Church in Rye, New York (1873−1882), rector of Christ Church in Detroit, Michigan (1882−1885), rector of Grace Church in Baltimore, Maryland (1885−1888) and rector of Grace Church in Brooklyn Heights, New York (1888−1897).

Brewster was consecrated as a bishop on October 28, 1897, and was a coadjutor bishop before serving as diocesan bishop from 1899 to 1928.

He was the author of The Key of Life (1894), Aspects of Revelation (1901), The Catholic Ideal of the Church (1905) and The Kingdom of God and American Life (1912).

Brewster Hall at Berkeley Divinity School was named in his honor in 1940. He died the following year and is buried in the Evergreen Cemetery in New Haven, Connecticut.

Family
Brewster married his first wife, Susan Huntington Whitney, daughter of Eli Whitney, in 1873 and had one son. Both his wife and his son died in May 1885, and in 1893 he married Alice Tucker Stephenson, with whom he had one daughter.

References

External links
Documents by and about Brewster from Project Canterbury
 

1848 births
1941 deaths
Hopkins School alumni
Yale College alumni
Berkeley Divinity School alumni
Episcopal Church in Connecticut
Episcopal bishops of Connecticut